Simon Otto (born 12 June 1973) is a Swiss film director and animator. He is best known for working as the Head of Character Animation of the Oscar-nominated How to Train Your Dragon film trilogy for DreamWorks Animation.

Life and career 
Otto was born in Switzerland and grew up in Gommiswald, in the canton of St. Gallen.

After completing a banking apprenticeship, he started his career in the arts by carving commercial snow sculptures in nearby resort towns and drawing news cartoons for his hometown newspaper, "Die Suedostschweiz".

He studied art formally at the F&F Schule fuer Experimentelle Gestaltung in Zurich. In 1995, Otto left Switzerland to study animation at the Gobelins Animation School in Paris, France where he also received additional animation training through an internship with Walt Disney Feature Animation Paris.

His professional animation career started in 1997, when he was hired by DreamWorks Animation in Los Angeles to work as a traditional character animator on their first 2D animated feature The Prince of Egypt. He then spent 21 years as part of the character animation team working on both 2D and CG projects for the studio. Otto is particularly known for his work as the Head of Character Animation for the How to Train Your Dragon movie franchise and has been instrumental in developing the look of the characters, their personalities and the overall style of animation for the films, and was rewarded for his achievements with the VES Awards for 'Visual Effects Society Award for Outstanding Visual Effects in an Animated Featuree' in 2011 by the Visual Effect Society. Simon Otto designed a number of characters in the film including Toothless and Lightfury and did storyboarding work on the second and third films. He was a key contributor to the development of Premo, the animation software developed at DreamWorks Animation that won an Academy Award for Technical Achievement.

Involved as a member of the Academy of Motion Picture Arts and Sciences, Simon participates in numerous of events, talks and interviews highlighting the work of the animator in the feature film industry. In 2016, Otto founded LuMAA (Lucerne Master Academy of Animation) with the Lucerne University of Applied Sciences and Arts in Lucerne, Switzerland where animation industry veterans teach a 6-week summer course for up and coming talents.

In the fall of 2019, after 21 years working for DreamWorks Animation, Simon left the company. He now works as an independent director on various film and television projects. His first released project after leaving the studio is the episode ‘The Tall Grass’ he directed for the Netflix TV series, Love, Death & Robots Season 2.

On 14 June 2021 it was announced that he will directing That Christmas, based on the book of the same name by Richard Curtis, produced from Locksmith Animation and Netflix.

Filmography

Director

Animator

References

External links 

 
 

Living people
1973 births
Swiss film directors
Swiss animators
DreamWorks Animation people